The Doncaster Panthers Basketball Club was established in 1954 by Morris Wordsworth and played out of Balby High School Gym in their formative years, then at various centres in Doncaster. Initially the team participated in an Anglo-American League based in a hangar on Doncaster Airport (where The Dome Leisure Centre is now) and the Sheffield and District League. In 1957, the Doncaster and District Basketball Association was formed with a League comprising seven teams.

In 1960, the Panthers participated in an International Basketball Tournament in Dublin. In 1961 and 1964, the Panthers played exhibition matches against US Menwith Hill of Harrogate and RAF Bomber Command respectively in the Doncaster Corn Exchange (no mean feat) and in 1965 played against St. Germain in France being the start of many twinned basketball visits between the two towns.

During the following years, the Club continued to develop with the Men's team being winners of the Yorkshire Premier League (1962-1981) and Yorkshire Cup (1961-1982) on numerous occasions. During this period they also played for one season in the US Menwith Hill Base ‘Trick’ League.  In 1967, the Club was successful in organising and participating in a World Record attempt, playing basketball non-stop for 28 hours 10 mins. 1968 saw the Panthers become the North of England Champions after beating Liverpool Police in the Vaux final.

The EBBA, now named Basketball England (BE) established the National Basketball League (NBL) in 1972 and the club playing as Wilson Panthers (Doncaster) gained entry to this elite competition for the 1973-74 season.  This was the NBL's second year of its existence and in 1987 it became the British Basketball League (BBL). The Club also registered as a limited liability company called Doncaster Basketball Club Limited with a registered nickname of “Panthers”.

1975 was the 21st anniversary of the Club's existence and was celebrated with the staging of an International Club Tournament played at Adwick Leisure Centre. Participating teams were: Pentland (Scotland), Blue Demons (Ireland), Paris Saint Germain (France), Patrarna Helsingborg (Sweden) and The Haarlem Cardinals (The Netherlands). They also participated in the European “Radivoj Korac” Cup (1975–76) playing against Berck, France.

After competing professionally over the next 12 years, the team withdrew from the NBL in 1985 due to a lack of finance. In the NBL the Panthers played initially out of Worksop Sports Centre, Adwick Leisure Centre, Doncaster and from 1982 out of Concord Sports Centre, Sheffield.

During their time in the NBL the Panthers (Men), playing as Team Ziebart, won the NBL and National Cup in season 1978-79, and were National Cup finalists playing as John Carr Panthers, for the next three seasons. They also participated in the Philips WICB (1977 to 1983). They represented Basketball England (BE) in the “William Jones Cup” International Tournament in Taiwan (1980), participated in the European Cup Winners Cup (1979–80 and 1980–81) playing as Austin Morris Panthers, made two tours of the Mid-West USA (1981 and 1982), won the British Championship (BIBF) in 1981-82, organised and participated in the South Yorkshire International Club Basketball Tournament for 9 years (1976 to 1984), played in a pre-season International Tournament in West Berlin, West Germany (1984) and various other international tournaments throughout the UK and Ireland during the 70's and early 80's.
																								
The Club withdrew from further competition at the end of the 1984-1985 season.

The Doncaster Panthers Juniors (Men) were successful in winning the National Cup in 1972 and 1975 after being Finalists in 1970 and 1971.

The  Doncaster Panthers Women's Section was formed 1965, participating in the National Basketball League at various levels. They have now withdrawn from competition.

Doncaster Eagles 1989-1992 / Doncaster Panthers 1992-1996 - England

The Doncaster Eagles joined the NBL Division 2 in 1989 and were promoted within a year to the NBL Division 1, the second-tier league level after the newly established BBL (formerly NBL). In 1992, Doncaster Eagles with the co-operation of Morris Wordsworth, renamed the team to Doncaster Panthers and the following season (1993) were admitted to the BBL. After three years in the elite League, the team withdrew due to financial difficulties and never returned to the league. They played out of The Dome Leisure Centre, Doncaster and competed professionally from 1993 to 1996.

A fund raising Reunion Match was played at The Dome Leisure Centre, Doncaster in 1992 between players of the original Panthers and the then current Panthers team (formerly Eagles).

An Official Reunion was held in 2011 at the Regent Hotel, Doncaster for all those associated with the Panthers from 1954 to 2011.

Doncaster Panthers Basketball Club

All-time playing record 1954-1985 Panthers (Men)
	
In the 32 campaigns the Panthers played 1601 games winning 1147 and losing 454.

 Season
 1954-55  W12  L8 
 1955-56  W16  L17	
 1956-57  W25  L21
 1957-58  W38  L19
 1958-59  W42  L15	 
 1959-60  W49  L11
 1960-61  W48  L36
 1961-62  W52  L21
 1962-63  W71  L20
 1963-64  W46  L8
 1964-65  W35  L9
 1965-66  W50  L7
 1966-67  W38  L10
 1967-68  W52  L11
 1968-69  W49  L11
 1969-70  W23  L13
 1970-71  W30  L14
 1971-72  W27  L12
 1972-73  W48  L17
 1973-74  W48  L12
 1974-75  W42  L13
 1975-76  W50  L9
 1976-77  W43  L10
 1977-78  W44  L17
 1978-79  W58  L7
 1979-80  W48  L17
 1979-80 W14 L4 NBL only shown
 1980-81 W9 L9 NBL only shown
 1981-82 W16 L6 NBL only shown
 1982-83 W12 L12 NBL only shown
 1983-84 W6 L30 NBL only shown
 1984-85 W6 L20 NBL only shown

See also
 British Basketball League
 Basketball England

Defunct basketball teams in England
Sport in Doncaster
1954 establishments in England
Basketball teams established in 1954
1996 disestablishments in England
Basketball teams disestablished in 1996